The 2022 American Athletic Conference women's soccer tournament was the postseason women's soccer tournament for the American Athletic Conference held from October 30 to November 6, 2022. The first round was hosted by the higher seed, and the Semifinals and Final took place at the home field of the regular season champion UCF. The six-team single-elimination tournament consisted of three rounds based on seeding from regular season conference play. The Memphis Tigers are the defending tournament champions. Memphis successfully defended its title, defeating East Carolina in the First Round, first-seed UCF in the Semifinals and SMU in the Final.  Memphis' win was the program's third and also the third for coach Brooks Monaghan. As tournament champions, Memphis earned the American's automatic berth into the 2022 NCAA Division I Women's Soccer Tournament.

Seeding 
The top six teams in the regular season earned a spot in the tournament.  A tiebreaker was required to determine the fifth and sixth seeds for the tournament as East Carolina and SMU both finished the regular season with identical 3–3–2 records.  East Carolina earned the fifth seed by virtue of their 2–1 regular season win at SMU on September 15, 2022.

Bracket

Source:

Schedule

First Round

Semifinals

Final

Statistics

Goalscorers

All-Tournament team

Source:

 * Offensive MVP
 ^ Defensive MVP

References 

 
American Athletic Conference Women's Soccer Tournament